Sihlbrugg is a former railway station in the Swiss Canton of Zürich. It was closed permanently in December 2012, and there are no passenger trains scheduled to stop at the station since then. The station was the terminus of the Sihltal line of SZU (ZVV S4) from 1897 to 2006.

The station was a junction point between the Swiss Federal Railways (SBB) Thalwil–Arth-Goldau railway, which connects Zug and Zürich Hauptbahnhof, and the Sihltal Zürich Uetliberg Bahn (SZU) line to Zürich via Sihlwald. The SBB line carried both suburban and longer distance services, and the station used to be served by line S21 of the Zürich S-Bahn. The suburban service on the SZU line between Sihlbrugg and Sihlwald was suspended in 2006, and that stretch of line no longer carries regular passenger services.

In the summer months, the station is served occasionally by the Zürcher Museums-Bahn heritage railway.

References

External links 
 

Railway stations in the canton of Zürich
Swiss Federal Railways stations
Horgen